The La Grange Dam is a masonry-gravity diversion dam on the Tuolumne River near La Grange, California. The dam was completed in 1883 by the Turlock Irrigation District and Modesto Irrigation District in an effort to divert water into their canal systems for local farmers.

The La Grange Dam is two miles (3 km) downstream of the New Don Pedro Dam and not only serves to regulate its outflows but diverts water from the Don Pedro’s much larger reservoir into two canals on either side of the river. About  goes through TID's canal to Turlock Lake and another  goes through MID's canal to Modesto Reservoir. Nearly all of this water irrigates crops in the Turlock and Modesto Irrigation Districts. Another  goes to San Francisco's Hetch Hetchy Water and Power.

The La Grange Dam also diverts water to a small 4 MW hydroelectric power station above the east bank of the Tuolumne River that is operated by the Turlock Irrigation District.

See also

List of dams and reservoirs in California

References

Buildings and structures in Stanislaus County, California
Dams in California
Hydroelectric power plants in California
Dams completed in 1883
United States local public utility dams
Energy infrastructure completed in 1923
Gravity dams
Dams on the Tuolumne River
Masonry dams
1883 establishments in California